Kevin Vermaerke (born October 16, 2000) is an American cyclist, who currently rides for UCI WorldTeam .

Major results

2017
 1st  National Junior XCO MTB Championships
 2nd Road race, National Junior Road Championships
2018
 8th Road race, UCI Junior Road World Championships
2019
 1st Liège–Bastogne–Liège Espoirs
 2nd Overall Redlands Bicycle Classic
1st Stage 2
 4th Lillehammer GP
2023
 6th Figueira Champions Classic
 8th Overall Vuelta a San Juan

Grand Tour general classification results timeline

References

External links

2000 births
Living people
American male cyclists
People from Rancho Santa Margarita, California
American people of Belgian descent
American people of Flemish descent